Yekaterina Ottovna Vazem (born Matilda Vazem; ; 25 January 1848, Moscow – 14 December 1937, Leningrad)  aka Ekaterina Vazem was a Russian prima ballerina and instructor, whose most noted pupil was the legendary Anna Pavlova.

Early life
She was born Matilda Vazem in 1848 in Moscow, Russian Empire. She moved to Saint Petersburg, where In 1866, she was named the best student of the Imperial Theatre School (now the Mariinsky Ballet).

She became famous for first dancing the role of Nikiya in 1877 Marius Petipa's ballet, La Bayadère. She went on to become the teacher of legendary prima ballerina Anna Pavlova.

La Bayadère
During the mid- to late 19th century, Russian ballet was dominated by foreign artists, though during the late 1860s through the early 1880s the theatre administration encouraged the promotion of native talent. Vazem – a terre-à-terre virtuosa – climbed the ranks of the Imperial Ballet to become one of the company's most celebrated dancers. Despite being a benefit performance for Vazem, with tickets being more expensive than for the opera, the first performance of La Bayadère played to a full house. At the end of the performance the audience applauded for more than half an hour. Reviews were uniformly complimentary although they did register complaints of Petipa's license in dealing with historical facts. They also dwelt on the unavoidable mishaps that befall most first performances. For example, in the Kingdom of the Shades scene, the appearance of a magic  palace was mistimed and delayed until after Nikiya had turned to face it.

Her students 
Among her notable students: Anna Pavlova, Olga Preobrajenska, Agrippina Vaganova, Mathilde Kschessinska, Vera Trefilova, Olga Spessivtseva, Elizaveta Gerdt, Elza Vill, Boris Shavrov, Konstantin Sergeyev, etc.

Mémoires
She authored a book of mémoires dictated to her son, entitled Записки балерины Санкт-Петербургского Большого театра. 1867–1884 ("Memoirs of a Ballerina of the St. Petersburg Bolshoi Theatre").

See also
 List of Russian ballet dancers

References

1848 births
1937 deaths
Prima ballerinas
Russian ballerinas
Dancers from Saint Petersburg